Robert Ziółkowski (born 10 March 1976) is a retired Polish football defender.

References

1974 births
Living people
Polish footballers
Hutnik Nowa Huta players
MKS Cracovia (football) players
Górnik Wieliczka players
Victoria Jaworzno players
Garbarnia Kraków players
Association football defenders